Sport is a significant part of life in India. The country has a very long sports history, with sports being a part of tradition, culture, finance and entertainment. People in India closely follow various sports and enthusiastically participate in them. Cricket is the most popular spectator sport in the country, and citizens often play it as a recreational activity; it generates the highest television viewership, and features full-capacity audiences in stadiums during international and Indian Premier League (IPL) matches. It is part of popular culture. However, in more recent decades, football has also become another popular sport in terms of broadcast viewership and stadium audience attendance. Kabaddi has grown into the mainstream, as well as badminton, tennis, and athletics. Kho-kho has grown into becoming the fourth-most viewed sport in India. India are the one of the power houses in field hockey. India won World Cup & multiple medals in field hockey in Olympics. During that time, Dhyan Chand was a notable player. Sports such as swimming and badminton are played as recreational activities and for exercise.

India celebrates its National Sports Day annually on 29 August, on the birthday of India's greatest hockey player, Major Dhyan Chand.

In recent decades Government of India and Ministry of Youth Affairs and Sports of India tried to boost the sport in the nation by launching and frequently organising new national sports events such as Khelo India Youth Games (KIYG), Khelo India Winter Games and Khelo India University Games (KIUG) of Khelo India games in various cities across the nation. Thousands of youngsters participated in it. The first Khelo India School games was held in 2018. The initiative also focused on building new infrastructure. KIYG and KIUG are set up as annual events for youngsters, who represent their states and universities in them. So far, the Sport ministry of India has organised many editions of these games.

India does not have a national game.

India's diversity in culture, people, and tribes is reflected in the wide variety of sporting disciplines in the country. Due to this, some indigenous sports are popular in some regions such as fighter kite and boat racing (including Vallam kali and Vallomkali).

Sports such as golf, rugby, boxing, kickboxing, mixed martial arts, motorsport and basketball are popular to some extent in a few places. Wrestling was and is popular in some states.

Indians participate in scuba diving, boating, surfing and kiteboarding in coastal tourist areas of Goa state, Tarkarli of Maharashtra, Rameshwaram, Netrani Island of Karnataka, Pondicherry, Lakshadweep Islands and in Andaman and Nicobar Islands.

Professional wrestling and Mixed Martial Arts (MMA) are popular sports among young audiences and generate high television viewership. Some Indian wrestlers have achieved great success at the international level in it. MMA sport has been seeing a massive surge in India in the last few years and has gained significant popularity. There are a few MMA promotions operating in the country.

Cricket became widely popular after India cricket team's 1983 World Cup victory. During the last couple of decades, India became a cricket powerhouse and a dominating team. The Board of Control for Cricket in India and the Indian Premier League (IPL) are the richest cricket governing body and cricket league in the world, respectively.

India has hosted the Cricket World Cup thrice and won it twice. Field hockey is the most successful sport for India at the Olympic Games; the Indian men's team have won twelve Olympic medals including eight gold medals. To some extent, popular sports are swimming, shooting, boxing, squash, weightlifting, gymnastics, mountain-climbing, skiing, table tennis, basketball, bodybuilding and volleyball. Popular indigenous sports include chess, kho kho, cycling, polo, snooker, and rugby. Cycling sport is becoming a popular recreational activity and exercise in India.

Kabaddi is an indigenous sport, considered as one of the fastest-growing sports in the nation, it generates significant television viewership. The India national kabbadi team has won a number of matches and editions of Asian Games, South Asian Games, and Asian Kabaddi Championship, as well as all of the three seasons of the Kabaddi World Cup (Standard style) and Women's Kabaddi World Cup (Circle Style). India men's team and women's team both are the most successful teams internationally.

The country has hosted, co-hosted several international sporting events, most notably the 1951 and 1982 Asian Games, the 1987, 1995 and 2016 South Asian Games, the 2010 Commonwealth Games, the 2014 Lusofonia Games, the 1987, 1996, 2011, 2016, 2021 Men's Cricket world cups and the 1978, 1997, 2013, 2016 Women's Cricket world cups. India has hosted editions of SAFF Championship in 1999, 2011, 2015; SAFF Women's Championship in 2016 and junior FIFA world cups such as 2017 FIFA U-17 World Cup, 2022 FIFA U-17 Women's World Cup of Football.  
  
India will host the 2023 Cricket World Cup, 2026 ICC T20 World Cup, 2031 Cricket World Cup, and 2025 Women's Cricket World Cup.

Domestic professional commercial sports leagues in the country include the Indian Premier League, Women's IPL (cricket), Indian Super League, I-League and Santosh Trophy (football), Pro Kabbadi (Kabaddi), Hockey India League (field hockey), Premier Badminton League (Badminton), Ultimate Table Tennis league (Table Tennis), Prime Volleyball League (Volleyball) and Ultimate Kho Kho league (Kho–kho).

The major international sporting events annually held in India include the ATP 250 Maharashtra Open of Tennis, Indian Open, golf, the India Open of badminton and India Open of Table tennis.

The annual Major Dhyan Chand Khel Ratna is India's highest award for achievement in sports, while the Dronacharya Award is awarded for excellence in coaching.

History

Ancient and Medieval period

The world's oldest stadium with terraced stands was constructed at Dholavira, Gujarat during third millennium BCE. Two stadiums have been identified at the ancient site, one is considered a ceremonial ground, another, a small stadium.

The importance of sports was also evident in India in the Vedic era. Physical culture in ancient India was fuelled by religious rights. The mantra in the Atharvaveda says, "Duty is in my right hand and the fruits of victory in my left." In terms of an ideal, these words hold the same sentiments as the traditional Olympic Oath: "For the Honour of my Country and the Glory of Sport."

The modern game of badminton has developed from an old children's game known in England as battledore and shuttlecock, a game popular in ancient India. The battledore was a paddle and the shuttlecock a small feathered cork, now usually called a "bird".

India has a rich heritage of Martial art. Kalaripayattu is practised by some as a tradition martial art in South India. As per the Mahabharata and Ramayana, Bhima and Hanuman were the greatest Gadadhari and earlier were accomplished wrestlers.

Games like chess and snakes and ladders originated from the ancient Indian games chaturanga and gyan chauper, respectively; these were later transmitted to foreign countries, where they were further modernized.

Several Indian variations of tag, such as kabaddi and kho-kho, are believed to have originated in prehistoric times, with the tag variant atya-patya finding mention in the Naṟṟiṇai (written in 300 CE).

During the rule of the Mughal Empire, a form of wrestling known as pehlwani developed, by combining native malla-yuddha with influences from Persian varzesh-e bastani.

British Colonial period 

During the colonial period, British India competed at six Olympic Games, notably winning medals in field hockey.

British sports were introduced into and became increasingly popular in India during this time period, with some Indians variously participating in British sports in order to rise up the ranks by imitating their colonisers, as well as aiming to achieve victory against the British in their sports in order to prove that the Indians were equal to their colonisers. Efforts were made to develop the native games of India during this time period; this led to the successful standardisation of games such as kabaddi and kho-kho.

Snooker originated in the late 19th century among British Army officers stationed in India. Modern polo originated in British India in the 19th century, from Manipur, where the game was known as Sagol Kangjei, Kanjai-bazee, or Pulu. The name "polo" is the anglicized version of the latter. The first polo club was established in Silchar, Assam, in 1833. The oldest polo club still in existence is the Calcutta Polo Club, which was established in 1862.

Dorabji Tata, with the support of Dr. A.G. Noehren, then director of YMCA, established the Indian Olympic Association in 1927.

One of the worlds' earliest football clubs, the Mohun Bagan FC was established in the 1880s in India. It is India's oldest professional football club. It is older than many famous European football clubs such as Real Madrid CF. The club was formed when The Football Association began making standard rules for football and even before FIFA, the international governing body of football was founded.

Post-Independence 

India hosted the Asian Games in New Delhi in 1951 and 1982. The current Ministry of Youth Affairs and Sports was initially set up as the Department of Sports in 1982 at the time of organisation of the Games in New Delhi. Its name was changed to the Department of Youth Affairs & Sports during celebration of the International Youth Year in 1985. India has also hosted or co-hosted several international sporting events, including the 1987, 1996 and 2011 Cricket World Cups, the 2003 Afro-Asian Games, the 2010 Hockey World Cup, and the 2010 Commonwealth Games. Major international sporting events annually held in India include the Chennai Open, the Mumbai Marathon and the Delhi Half Marathon. The country hosted the first Indian Grand Prix in 2011. The biggest stadium in the world, Narendra Modi Stadium is present in India.

Administration

The Ministry of Youth Affairs and Sports is the dedicated ministry of Government of India for sport in the country. Anurag Thakur is the incumbent sports minister of India.

The sports ministry is run by a Secretary to the Government of India, and is usually headed by a Minister of State. A ministry-recognised National Sports Federation Of India (NSFOI) represents each Olympic and non-Olympic sport, the only major exception being the Board of Control for Cricket in India (BCCI), which is not an NSFOI. As of 2019, 56 NSFs are recognised by the ministry. The presence of politicians at the helm of many such federations has been criticised for causing inefficiency and corruption.

For each sport, India has a separate national sports governing body. These include the All India Football Federation for football, National Rifle Association of India for shooting sport, Boxing Federation of India for Boxing etc.

Sports Authority of India, the field arm of the ministry, supports and nurtures talent in youth, and provides them with the requisite infrastructure, equipment, hostels, diet, training-coaching facilities and competition exposure.

The Indian Olympic Association (IOA) is responsible for the Indian contingent's participation in the Olympic Games, Commonwealth Games, Asian Games (outdoor, indoor and beach), and South Asian Games, Lusofonia Games, and World Games and Military World Games. The selection of the national teams is done by the respective national federations and then recommended to the IOA for official sponsorship for participation in those games.

The Paralympic Committee of India is responsible for the Indian contingent's participation in the Paralympic Games and Asian Para Games.

The All India Sports Council for the Deaf is responsible for India's participation in the Deaflympics Games. The Special Olympics Bharat is responsible for India's participation in the Special Olympics.

The Association of Indian Universities is responsible for India participating in the Universiade Games. The School Games Federation of India is responsible for India's participation in the Gymnasiade Games.

International sports events held in India

The following is a list of international sports events held in India:

India at major international multi–sports events

Olympics

A single athlete, Norman Pritchard, represented India in the 1900 Olympics, winning two silver medals. India sent its first national team to the Olympics in 1920, and has participated in every Summer Olympic Games ever since. India has also competed at several Winter Olympic Games since 1964.

As of 2021, India has won a total of 35 Summer Olympic medals. India won its first gold medal in men's field hockey in the 1928 Olympic Games. On winning the 10m air rifle event at the 2008 Olympics, Abhinav Bindra became the first Indian to win an individual gold medal at the Olympic Games, and India's first gold medal since 1980, when the men's field hockey team had won the gold.

India also performed in Paralympic Games.

Commonwealth Games

India has competed in all but four editions of the Commonwealth Games, starting at the second Games in 1934. India has hosted the Games once, in 2010 at Delhi. India is the fourth-most successful country at the games; it has won a total of 504 medals, including 181 gold medals.

Asian Games

India has participated in every edition of the Asian Games, and has hosted the Games in 1951 and 1982 at New Delhi. As of 2018, India is the sixth-most successful country, winning 671 medals, including 139 golds. India has won at least one gold medal in each tournament.

India's performance is also very commendable in Asian Para Games.

World Games

India has participated in every edition of the World Games. India has won total 5 medals including one gold.

South Asian Games

India has participated in every edition of the South Asian Games. India has No.1 Rank in this Multi–sport competition.

Lusofonia Games

India has also participate in the Lusofonia Games. India's performance very well in this multi–sport event.

Others Multi–Sport Events

India also participated in Deaflympics Games, Special Olympics Games, Military World Games, Universiade Games, Gymnasiade Games.

The National Games of India

The National Games of India are conducted by the Indian Olympic Association and are meant to identify national sporting talents who can be selected for the Olympics. The first National Games, then called the Indian Olympic Games, were held in Lahore in 1924, while the first modern Games were held in New Delhi in 1985.

Olympic sports

Archery 

The game of archery has historical significance, as royals in the ancient days used to practice archery. Modern-day archery in India began in the early 1970s, before its introduction as an Olympic event in 1972, and it was formalised in 1973 when the Archery Association of India (AAI) came into existence. Since its inception, AAI has been creating an organised structure for the sport. India has been producing some world class players who are the medal hopefuls in international events of archery.

Athletics 

India is considered a backward country in Athletics. Very few Indian athletes have won medals and championships at international level. As of 28 October 2022, It have won three medals in summer Olympics. Athletics Federation of India is the national governing body of Athletics sport in India.

Norman Pritchard was the first Indian athlete, sprinter who won an Olympic medal for India, he won two silver medals in 200m sprint and 200m hurdle, track and field event in 1900 Paris Olympic.

Neeraj Chopra won the first ever Olympic gold medal in track and field event for India, at the 2020 Summer Olympics in Tokyo. He won the medal in Javelin throw sport. It is only second individual Olympic gold medal by an Indian so far.

Anju Bobby George made history when she won the bronze medal in Women's long jump at the 2003 World Championships in Athletics in Paris. With this achievement, she became the first Indian athlete ever to win a medal in a World Championships in Athletics jumping 6.70 mll 2010 Milkha Singh was the only athlete to win an individual gold medal at a Commonwealth Games but at 2010 Commonwealth Games, Krishna Punia created history by winning the Women's discus throw gold medal for India after 52 years and as first woman to win a gold in athletics at Commonwealth Games. In the same edition of Commonwealth games Manjeet Kaur, Sini Jose, Ashwini Akkunji & Mandeep Kaur won the Women's 4 × 400 m (Relay) gold medal. At 2014 Commonwealth Games Vikas Gowda won the Men's Discus Throw gold medal.

Hima Das is the only Indian track athlete to win a medal at any IAAF global event. She won the gold medal in Women's 400 metres at 2018 IAAF World U20 Championships at Tampere, Finland, on 12 July 2018, clocking a time of 51.46 seconds. She is the second gold medalist in athletics at IAAF World U20 Championships after Neeraj Chopra who won men's javelin throw gold at 2016 IAAF World U20 Championships by setting world junior record with a throw of 86.48 m. Later Neeraj went on to win the men's javelin throw gold at 2018 Commonwealth Games. In 2020, at the Tokyo Olympics, he became the first Indian athlete to win an Olympic gold medal in men's javelin throw. At 2016 Summer Olympics Lalita Babar becomes the first Indian athlete since 1984 to reach Olympics finale in the event of Women's 3000 metres steeplechase, before her, P.T. Usha reach the finale of Women's 400 metres hurdles at 1984 Summer Olympics.

P.T. Usha won multiple gold medals in different editions of Asian Games and Asian Athletics Championships. Lavy Pinto was the first Indian to win a gold medal in the Asian Games which he won in the first Asian Games held at New Delhi in 1951 in the 100- and 200-meter categories. Christine Brown, Stephie D'Souza, Violet Peters, Mary D'Souza gave India its first women's athletics gold medal when they won 4 × 100 m relay in 1954 Asian Games but current Asian record is held by Priyanka Pawar, Tintu Luka, Mandeep Kaur, Machettira Raju Poovamma when they won Women's 4 × 400 metres relay at 2014 Asian Games clocking 3:28:68. Kamaljeet Sandhu was the first Indian female athlete to win individual gold medal at any Asian games by winning 400m track event at 1970 Asian Games. Sunita Rani holds the current Asian record in 1500 m track event winning at Busan 2002 Asian Games clocking 4:06:03.

Madhurjya Borah, an Indian triathlete holds the silver medal for the South Asian Triathlon Championship.

Anu Vaidyanathan, an Indian triathlete, is the first Asian to compete in Ultraman.

In May 2016, Arunaabh Shah from Delhi became the first Indian male and the youngest Indian to finish Ultraman, at Ultraman Australia.

Neeraj Chopra became first Indian athlete to win the prestigious Diamond League trophy at Zürich in 2022. He did this by throwing a javelin 88.44 m. On 24 July 2022, he won the silver medal in the 2022 World Athletics Championships in Oregon, USA; he is the only athlete from India to have done so.

In the 2022 Commonwealth Games, Avinash Sable and Priyanka Goswami won the first ever silver medals for India in the games' history and in any major multinational events in the 3000m steeplechase and 10,000m racewalking events respectively.

Badminton 

Badminton is played in India and is one of the popular sports in the nation. People often play it as a recreational activity. It is most popular in South India, with the region having multiple badminton academies and coaching facilities; this is why many accomplished shuttlers are from South India.

The Badminton Association of India is the national governing body of badminton in India. It organises multiple national tournaments.

In 2022, the Indian Badminton team created history by winning the Thomas Cup tournament. It is a prestigious Badminton tournament.

P. V. Sindhu, Srikanth Kidambi, and the doubles pair of Satwiksairaj Rankireddy-Chirag Shetty are ranked amongst the Top-10 in the current BWF world rankings. Prakash Padukone was the first player from India to achieve the world number one spot in the game, after which Srikanth Kidambi became the second male player to make it to the top spot in April 2018. Saina Nehwal is the first female player from India to achieve the World number one spot, which she did in April 2015, and the first Indian badminton player to win a medal at the Olympic Games.

Sindhu is the first Indian to become the Badminton World Champion, which she achieved in 2019, and the only badminton player from India to win two consecutive medals at the Olympic Games.

The most successful doubles player from India is Jwala Gutta, who is the only Indian to have been ranked in the Top-10 of two categories. She peaked at no. 6 with Valiyaveetil Diju in mixed doubles and at no. 10 with Ashwini Ponnappa in women's doubles.

Other successful players include Pullela Gopichand, Aparna Popat, Syed Modi, Chetan Anand, Parupalli Kashyap, Prannoy Kumar, Sameer Verma, Lakshya Sen, Ashwini Ponnappa and N. Sikki Reddy.

Prakash Padukone and Pullela Gopichand both won the All England Open in 1980 and 2001 respectively, making them the only Indians to win the prestigious title.

Saina Nehwal won the bronze medal in the individual women's competition at the 2012 London Olympic Games, the first Olympic medal for the country in badminton. P. V. Sindhu won the second and the third Olympic medals in badminton for India, winning a silver and a bronze medal at the 
2016 Rio Olympics and the 2020 Tokyo Olympics respectively.

India has also won twelve medals at the BWF World Championships, with P. V. Sindhu being the only Indian badminton player to have won the Gold, which she achieved in 2019. At the BWF World Junior Championships, Saina Nehwal is the only gold medalist for India, which she achieved in 2008. At the Badminton Asia Junior Championships, P. V. Sindhu and Lakshya Sen are the only gold medalists for India, winning in their respective categories in 2012 and 2018 respectively.

Boxing 

Boxing is a highly profiled sport in India, and although it is a regular medal-holder at the Asian Games and Commonwealth Games. Indian boxers have achieved considerable success in Amateur boxing but not in Professional boxing. In November 2007, India's Mary Kom won the best boxer title and secured a hat-trick of titles. During the 2008 Beijing Olympics, Vijender Singh won a bronze medal in the middleweight division, and Akhil Kumar and Jitender Kumar qualified for the quarterfinals. Akhil Kumar, Jitender Kumar, A.L. Lakra, and Dinesh Kumar each won a bronze medal at the 2008 World Championship. India's lone female boxer, Kom, won the bronze medal at the 2012 London Olympic Games.

Field Hockey 

Field Hockey is a popular sport in Odisha state. Until the mid-1970s, India men's team dominated international field hockey, winning even Olympic gold medals and won the 1975 Men's Hockey World Cup. Since then, barring a gold medal at the 1980 Olympics, and a bronze medal at Tokyo 2020 Olympics, India's performance in field hockey has been dismal, as Australia, Netherlands and Germany improved. Its decline is also due to the change in rules of the game, introduction of artificial turf, and internal politics in Indian field hockey bodies. The popularity of field hockey has also declined massively parallel to the decline of the Indian hockey team. Throughout the 1980s, 1990s and 2000s, the standard of Indian hockey greatly deteriorated, with a low point occurring in 2008, after the Men's team failed to qualify for the 2008 Olympics and finishing last in the 2012 Olympics.

However, since the mid-2010s the men's team has undergone a gradual revival at the regional, continental, and global stage, becoming runners up at the 2014 Commonwealth Games and winning 2014 Asian Games gold. Despite bowing out at the quarter final stage of the 2016 Rio Olympics following a loss to Belgium, India would capture the 2017 Men's Hockey Asia Cup title, restoring consistent dominance in Asia. A marked Olympic improvement was witnessed at the 2020 games in Tokyo, when India captured the bronze medal, signifying the first medal and highest placing at the tournament in 41 years - since 1980. Currently, the Indian men's team is 5th in the rankings of the Fédération Internationale de Hockey sur Gazon (FIH, English:International Hockey Federation), the international governing body of field hockey and indoor field hockey.

The Women's team came of age in 1980 when they first participated at the Summer Olympics and achieved the fourth place. The first golden moment for the team was in 1982 at the Asian Games. Since then not much of happening moments in the team history, though in 2016 after 34 years, it is a little hope when Indian women's team qualified for the Summer Olympics and they went on to win the 2017 Women's Hockey Asia Cup claiming the Asian dominance after 2004. India Women's team failed to win any medal in the Women's Hockey World Cup. The present team is ranked 10th by the Fédération Internationale de Hockey.

India has hosted three Men's Hockey World Cups–one in 1982 in Mumbai, another in 2010 in Delhi, where they finished fifth and eighth respectively, and the third at Bhubaneswar in 2018. India also hosted the annual Hockey Champions Trophy in 1996, 2005 2014 and 2016. Until 2008, the Indian Hockey Federation (IHF) was the apex body for hockey in the country. However, following revelations of corruption and other scandals in the IHF, the federation was dissolved and de-recognised, and a new apex body for Indian hockey called Hockey India (HI) was formed on 20 May 2009, with support from the IOA and former hockey players. HI, recognised by the International Hockey Federation (FIH), has the sole mandate to govern and conduct all activities for both men's and women's field hockey in India. Although the IHF was reinstated in 2010, it is not recognised by the FIH. The IHF conducts a franchise-based tournament called World Series Hockey (WSH), with its first season conducted in 2012. However, it is not approved by HI or the FIH.

HI also conducts a franchise-based tournament called the Hockey India League (HIL). Its first season was held in 2013, It is inspired from IPL. It is recognised by the FIH, which has also decided to provide a 30-day window for the forthcoming seasons so all top players can participate.

Football 

Football was introduced to India during the British colonial period. All India Football Federation is national governing body for football in India. It is also known by its abbreviation 'AIFF'. It is affiliated to FIFA, the international governing body of football and Asian Football Federation (AFF).

Although India has never played in any FIFA World Cups. India did qualify for the 1950 FIFA World Cup in Brazil, however it did not participate because the team was not allowed to play barefoot. Some also excuse that AIFF did not have money to travel to Brazil that time. But this 'barefoot' excuse is false according to Los Angeles Times's 19 July 2011 article, FIFA was ready to give money to Indian team to travel to Brazil for World Cup, so money was not a problem, some journalist who cover football said in that article, Indian football federation wasn't aware how big is FIFA football World cup that time, and considered it as another event and use to consider Olympics biggest tournament, also there was issue in team selection. India did not participate because FIFA did not allowed to play barefoot, it was just a lie to cover-up failure of AIFF. It was a 'historical blunder' done by AIFF according to a book 'Box to box: 75 years of the Indian football team authored by sports journalist Jaydeep Basu, in his book he reveled that, Indian football team did not play 1950 FIFA World Cup because, ignorance, short-sightedness, lack of confidence in the players and misplaced priorities on behalf of the All India Football Federation'.

In 1948 Summer Olympics, Indian team drew great attention of the world by stopping France on 2–1. India lost that match.

India was an Asian powerhouse in football in the 1950s and 1960s. During this golden era, India created history as the first Asian team to reach semi-finals in an Olympic football tournament in 1956 Summer Olympics at Melbourne and Neville D'Souza became the first Asian and Indian to score a hat-trick (record remains unbeaten) in an Olympic match. India also finished as runners-up in the 1964 AFC Asian Cup. But later on, the standard of football started to decline due to lack of professionalism and fitness culture. India currently ranks 105th in the FIFA rankings as of 12 August 2021.

Football is, nevertheless, widely popular both as a spectator sport, and as a participation sport in some parts of the country such as Kerala, West Bengal, Karnataka, Goa and the Northeast. The India national football team and India women's national football team represents India in all FIFA, Asian Football Federation and international, friendly tournaments in men's and women's football respectively.

Indian Super League and I-League are deemed as top-tier football league in India, earlier is most attended by audience in stadium and witnessed on TV.

In June 1937, at the Army Headquarters, Shimla, the  AIFF was formed at a meeting of the representatives of football associations of six regions where the game was very popular in those days. It is the governing body for football in India. Other major domestic competitions for men's football include the I-League second Division in the Indian League System and the annual knock-out style Federation Cup. For women's football, the India women's football championship.

European leagues, such as the English Premier League, Spanish La Liga and the UEFA Champions League, which are very popular among Indian football fans, especially in metropolitan cities. Other European top leagues such as UEFA Europa League, Germany's Bundesliga, Italy's Serie A and France's Ligue 1 are broadcast on television in India.

The nation has hosted 2017 FIFA U-17 World Cup, this was the first FIFA junior football world cup held in India. To boost raise interest in youth football in before the 2017 U-17 World Cup, India launched the Mission XI Million programme. The matches were held from 6 to 28 October in the cities of New Delhi, Kolkata, Kochi, Navi Mumbai, Guwahati and Margao.

In club football, rivalry between Mohan Bagan and East Bengal FC of West Bengal in notable, it is dubbed as Kolkata Derby and viewers attend it in huge numbers. The rivalry between India-Pakistan in football also generate interest in fans.

Football is most popular in Indian states such as Mizoram, Manipur, West Bengal, Kerala, Assam, Tripura, Meghalaya, Sikkim, Goa and Tamil Nadu etc. As of 2021, in ISL teams, 25% players was from Mizoram and Manipur states of Northeast India. Most of the players of India national football team are from these northeast states. It have significant number of football clubs such as Aizawl FC, Shillong Lajong FC, Neroca FC etc. Which play in I-League. Northeast states are considered as breeding ground of football players for Indian football team, ISL and I-League.

 Golf 

Golf is a growing sport in India. It is especially popular among the wealthier classes, but has not yet caught on with others due to the expenses involved in playing.

The most successful Indian golfers are Jeev Milkha Singh and Anirban Lahiri. Singh won three titles on the European Tour, four on the Japan Golf Tour, and six on the Asian Tour. His highest world ranking was 28 March 2009. Singh has won the Asian Tour Order of Merit twice. Meanwhile, Lahiri has two European Tour wins and seven Asian Tour wins. He qualified for the 2015 Presidents Cup.

Other Indians who have won the Asian Tour Order of Merit are Jyoti Randhawa in 2002 (the first Indian to do so), and Arjun Atwal, who went on in 2010 to become the first Indian-born player to become a member of the US-based PGA Tour and win the 2010 Wyndham Championship.

In golf at the Asian Games, India's men's golf team won gold at the 1982 Asian Games, and silver at the 2006 Asian Games. Lakshman Singh won the individual gold at the 1982 Asian Games.

There are numerous golf courses all over India, and a Professional Golf Tour of India. The main tournament is the Hero Indian Open, co-sanctioned by the Asian Tour and European Tour.

In  Tokyo 2020 Olympics, Aditi Ashok finished at fourth position in women Golf Competition. It was best ever performance by an Indian golfer at Olympics.

 Gymnastics 
 

Gymnastics is not widely played, participated in India, due to lack of facilities, exposure, encouragement, championships, sponsorships and coaching. But the Sport gained headlines after the historic performance of Deepa Karmakar in Rio Olympics, where she reached the 4th position in the final in her debut. She missed the Olympic bronze medal by just 0.15 points to Giulia Steingrubber of Switzerland. The success made her well known sportspersons in the nation and encouraged new girls and boys to play Gymnastic sport.

Gymnastics Federation of India is the official governing body for Gymnastics sport in India. It organises various tournaments around the year, it is recognised by Ministry of Youth Affairs and Sports of India.

Ashish Kumar won the first-ever medal in gymnastics for India, a bronze in 2010 Commonwealth Games, he also won a silver medal in the Men's vault in it.

It was Glasgow 2014 Commonwealth Games, that Dipa Karmakar from Tripura won the bronze medal in the Women's vault final. Her second vault, the most difficult vault with a D-score of 7, the Produnova vault, named after famous Yelena Produnova of Russia, also known as the vault of death due to its difficulty and likelihood of injury, which she executed with a score of 15.1 (D-7, Ex- 8.1) which contributed to her winning the bronze medal. With this attempt she became fifth gymnast to ever execute the Produnova just after legendary gymnast Oksana Chusovitina who executed multiples times. In October 2015, Karmakar became the first Indian gymnast to qualify for a final stage at the World Artistic Gymnastics Championships. Later in 2016 when she qualified for Rio Olympics, she became first Indian gymnast to do so and also hours after her qualification at 2016 Gymnastics Olympic Test Event she clinched gold medal in Women's vault event stunning Oksana Chusovitina with her prudunova again who came second to her. On 6 July 2016, FIG honored Dipa by naming her World Class Gymnast. At Rio Olympics she achieved fourth place in vaults. After a long break due to injury when she ran for vaults and landed with a gold at World Challenge Cup series.

 Tennis 

 

Tennis is a popular sport among Indians in urban areas. Tennis has gained popularity after the success of Vijay Amritraj, he was India's first and so far only singles player who reached quarterfinal of Wimbledon grandslam. He reached two times to the quarterfinals. Amritraj was notable player in the 1960s, 1970s. He is the first Indian singles tennis player who was in top 50 in WTA rankings . Once he was world number 16 singles player. His brother also was a professional tennis player.

All India Tennis Association, is the national governing body for Tennis in India. It is affiliated to International Tennis Federation (ITF), the governing body for Tennis in the world. Maharashtra Open is the biggest international tennis tournament in India. It is an ATP Tour 250  tournament, annually held in Pune, in which top players around the world participate in men's singles and doubles.

In Grand Slam,
Indians are not successful in singles as they are in doubles. India is considered as good in Tennis's doubles category. Indians has won multiple Tennis Grand Slam in men's doubles or mixed doubles category. Players such as Leander Paes won a singles bronze medal at the 1996 Olympics. Since the late 1990s India has had impressive results in Grand Slam doubles, Leander Paes and Mahesh Bhupathi have won many men's doubles and mixed doubles Grand Slam titles. Sania Mirza is the most notable Indian woman tennis player, having won a WTA title and breaking into the Top 30 WTA rankings, also winning three Grand Slam doubles events, the first at Wimbledon in 2015. In singles Somdev Devvarman and Yuki Bhambri got some success in ATP Tour. Yuki was the Australian Open junior singles champion in 2009. Rohan Bopanna has won two mixed doubles titles. On the women's side, Ankita Raina and Karman Kaur Thandi were in the top 200 in 2018.

 Shooting 

The National Rifle Association of India (NRAI) was founded in 1951 with a view to promote and popularize the shooting sports in India, is the governing body for shooting sport in India.  The country have won many medals internationally in various forms of this sport. 

Rajyavardhan Singh Rathore won first Olympic medal in shooting for India, he won silver in Athens 2004 Summer Olympics in Double trap Rifle shooting, he also have won 3 commonwealth gold medals and one silver and a silver and bronze in Asian games. 
Later many shooters won medals in Commonwealth games, South Asian games etc.

Abhinav Bindra won the first Olympic gold medal in shooting at 2008 Beijing Olympics. It was the first individual Olympic gold medal by an Indian in Olympics.

Gagan Narang won Bronze medal  2012 Summer Olympics in 10 meter Air rifle shooting event. He won 4 gold medals in  Commonwealth Games of 2006 at Melbourne, among these two he won with Abhinav Bindra in team event.

 Weightlifting 

Karnam Malleswari won a bronze medal at the 2000 Summer Olympics in Sydney, making her the first Indian woman to win an Olympic medal. The headquarters of the Indian Weightlifting Federation is in New Delhi. The federation is affiliated with the Indian Olympic Association (Delhi), and is also a member of the Asian Weightlifting Federation (Tehran) and International Weightlifting Federation (IWF, Budapest).

In 2021, Saikhom Mirabai Chanu won silver medal in 49 kg category in 2020 Summer Olympics held in Tokyo, Japan. In 2022, she won Gold at Barmingham  Commonwealth games.

 Wrestling 

Considered one of the most ancient and oldest sports in the world, wrestling in India has a glorious past. The sport of wrestling began its journey in India several centuries ago, during the Middle Ages. Wrestling is among the most prestigious and oldest events in the Olympic Games. It was included in the Olympics in 708 BC. In ancient times, wrestling in India was mainly used as a way to stay physically fit. It was also used as a military exercise without any weapons. Wrestling in India is also known as dangal, and it is the basic form of a wrestling tournament.

In India, wrestling is mostly known as Malla-Yuddha. Wrestling was mentioned in ancient times, found in the Sanskrit epic of Indian history, Mahabharata. One of the premier characters in Mahabharata, Bhima, was considered a great wrestler. Other great wrestlers included Jarasandha, Duryodhana, and Karna. Another Indian epic, Ramayana, also mentions wrestling in India, describing Hanuman as one of the greatest wrestlers of that time. The 13th-century Malla Purana references a group of Gujarati Brahmin wrestlers known as Jyesthimallas.

 Table Tennis 

Table tennis is a popular indoor recreation sport in India, which has caught on in states including West Bengal and Tamil Nadu. The Table Tennis Federation of India is the official governing body of the sport. India, which is ranked 30th in the world, has produced a single player ranked in the top 50, Sharat Kamal.

 Aquatic Sports 

The Swimming Federation of India (SFI) is the national governing body for aquatic sports in India. Legally, it is a non-profit association registered under the West Bengal Societies Registration Act, 1861. The Federation holds elections for its office bearers every four years.  The SFI currently oversees competition in the sports of swimming, masters swimming, synchronized swimming, diving, high diving, and water polo. It is affiliated to FINA, and the Asia Swimming Federation (ASF).

Sajan Prakash and Srihari Natraj became the first-ever Indian swimmers to qualify for the Olympic Games (2020 Olympics) by breaching the A standard time.

 Basketball 

Basketball is a popular sport in India, played in almost every school, although very few people follow it professionally. India has both men's and women's national basketball teams. Both teams have hired head coaches who have worked extensively with NBA players and now aim to popularise the game in India. Satnam Singh Bhamara officially marks the first player from India to be selected in the NBA by being taken by the Dallas Mavericks as the 52nd pick of the 2015 NBA draft, as well as the first player to be drafted straight out of high school as a postgraduate.

The Young Cagers, as the national team is nicknamed, made one Olympic appearance in basketball, and appeared 20 times in the Asian Championship. India is currently ranked 58th in the world in basketball. The India national team had its best result at the 1975 Asian Championship, when the team finished ahead of teams including the Philippines, one of Asia's basketball strongholds. Internationally, one of the most recognised Indian basketball players has been Sozhasingarayer Robinson. Affiliated into the International Basketball Federation (FIBA) since 1936, India has one of Asia's longest basketball traditions.

India's women had their best result at the recent 2011 FIBA Asia Championship for Women when they finished sixth. The team has several internationally known players including Geethu Anna Jose, who was invited to tryouts for the WNBA in 2011.

 Volleyball 

Volleyball is a popular recreation sport played all over India, both in rural and urban areas. India is ranked fifth in Asia, and 27th in the world. In the youth and junior levels, India came in second in the 2003 World Youth Championships. The Indian senior men's team is ranked 46th in the world. A major problem for the sport is the lack of sponsors.

 Canoeing and Kayaking 
India has won one bronze medal in canoeing at the Asian Games.

Flat water and sea kayaking
Indian flat water kayakers are an emerging powerhouse on the Asian circuit. Outside of professional flat water kayaking, there is very limited recreational kayaking. The potential to generate interest in flat water kayaking is held by leisure resorts located near the sea or other water bodies. Indian tourists tend to consider kayaking a one-time activity, rather than a sport to be pursued.

Whitewater kayaking
Enthusiasts of whitewater kayaking are concentrated in the north towards the Himalayas, with some in the south in Bangalore in Karnataka. Most of these enthusiasts are or were whitewater raft guides who took to the sport of whitewater kayaking. Some of the prominent whitewater kayakers include Abhinav Kala, Shalabh Gahlaut, and John Pollard. Many of them have notched first descents (similar to climbing ascents) on rivers in India and Nepal.

"Bangalore Kayakers" or "Southern River Runners" are India's first amateur group of white water kayakers. Based out of Bangalore, they explore rivers around Western Ghats. The lure for most of these participants is adventure. Whitewater kayaking in India allows for exploration of places where, literally, no human has been before.

Gear availability is a problem that plagues kayakers. While the global designs for whitewater boats and paddles change annually, Indian kayakers have to pay high fees if they want to import any kind of gear, or they have to buy used gear in Nepal. More often than not, one will see Indian kayaking guides riding down the river in a Perception Amp, Piroutte or Dancer designs, while the kayakers from abroad ride the river in their new design, planing hull, centred-volume kayaks from Riot, Pyranha, or Wave Sport.

Kayaking India groups on Facebook are good resources for kayakers in India.

 Rowing 

India's history in rowing dates back to the British era. The first club, the Calcutta Rowing Club was founded in 1858. The Rowing Federation of India administers the sport in the country. India's first ever Asian Games gold medal was won by Bajrang Lal Takhar in 2010 but the country has never won an Olympic medal in the sport.

 Sailing 

Sailing as a sport in India can be traced back to the first recorded race being sailed on 6 February 1830 in the western city of Bombay. Till the time the British left India in 1947, there were five active sailing clubs located at Bombay, Madras, Bangalore, Barrackpore and Nainital. Today, there are clubs located in Kerala, Pune, Goa, Hyderabad, and Bhopal. The Yachting Association of India is the governing body for sailing, windsurfing and motorboating in India. The Yachting Association of India was formally constituted on 15 May 1960.

 Cycling 

The history of cycling in India dates back to 1938, and the Cycling Federation of India governs the sport. Though cycling is unknown as a professional sport in India, it is popular as a common recreational sport and a way to keep fit. Children's and younger people do cycling as recreational activity and as play. Some adults use bicycles to travel. Presently cycling is not considered as a commercial professional sport in the nation.

Mountain biking

Mountain biking is becoming a popular sport in India. Uttarakhand tourism development annually organise Uttrakhand Himalyan MTB tournament in which 50 mountain bikers participate in 884 km long race, which runs for a week. It is Asia's longest mountain bike race,  bikers around the world take part in this mountain race.

For the last six years, Mtb himachal, a hardcore endurance event, has been organised regularly by Himalayan Adventure Sports & Tourism Promotion Association (HASTPA), a non-governmental organisation (NGO). A number of national and international riders participate, including Indian Army, Indian Air Force, Indo-Tibetan Border Police (ITBP), and a number of young and energetic mountain biking individual riders from cities including Pune, Bangalore, Delhi and Chandigarh. Last year, the government of Sikkim (Department of Tourism) introduced its own mountain biking race, with Southeast Asia's biggest prize money. The second edition saw 48 professional participants from around the globe.

Road Cycling/Touring

The Tour of Nilgiris is a major non-competitive and non-commercial touring event in South Asia that covers 1,000 kilometres in under 10 days. The Tour of Nilgiris (TfN), India's first Day Touring Cycle Ride, was born in December 2008 with the twin objectives of promoting bicycling as an activity and spreading awareness about the bio-diversity, flora and fauna of the Nilgiris.

It soon grew into something a lot more, with an eclectic riding community in 2008 wanting to participate. The community soon assembled, made plans, chose a route and realised they would need a framework to support such a large group of people. So they recruited sponsors to mitigate costs as well as popularise the Tour and the cause of popularising cycling as a viable and sustainable means of travel. Ever since its first edition, the TfN has stayed true to the Community of Cyclists in India by being a Tour for the Community, Of the Community and By the Community. It has grown in size, stature and visibility. From 40 riders in the first edition, it has grown to 100 cyclists in 2013.

The tour has grown bigger and the routes tougher, allowing cyclists to test their endurance, enjoy the biodiversity of the Nilgiris covering the southern states of Karnataka, Tamil Nadu and Kerala. For the racing aficionados, there are racing segments on the tour with colour coded jerseys, recognition and prizes. TfN as it is lovingly called is pushing cycling to new frontiers with more and more interested cyclists, applying for the tour. The tour has acquired quite a name, and currently about 25% of registrations are selected for the tour by the organisers.

 Equestrian sports 

India has a wide following in various equestrian sports, including show jumping, eventing, dressage, endurance riding and tent pegging. Supported by the Equestrian Federation of India, eventing is the most popular of the five, with teams representing the country at most Asian Games, winning a bronze medal in the 2002 and 2006 games. India has been represented at the Olympics twice, by Wing Commander I.J. Lamba, and Imtiaz Anees.

 Judo 

Judo is played by few in India. It is not widely known. The first written record about judo in India in Kodokan is about demonstrations and coaching of Judo by Shinzo Tagaki arranged at Shantiniketan in 1929 by Rabindranath Tagore. The Judo Federation of India was formed in 1965.

As of 31 October 2022, India have 11 commonwealth games medals in Judo. Indian Judoka Tulika Maan and Sushila Devi each won a silver Vijay Kumar Yadav won a Bronze in 2022 Commonwealth Games.

 Taekwondo 

Taekwondo in India is administered by the India Taekwondo which was constituted in July 2019 consting of a five-member ad hoc committee with Namdev Shirgaonkar as chairman with a mandate to carry out the election procedures within a stipulated time-frame. . Surendra Bhandari won a bronze medal in taekwondo at the 2002 Asian Games. Taekwondo is not widely played in India. Few actors Neetu Chandra, Akshay Kumar and Isha Koppikar said to have black belts in this sport.

Indian athlete performed well at 2019 South Asian Games, they won total six medals including 3 golds in Taekwondo event,  Rudali Barua (over 73 kg), Jarnel Singh (under 74 kg) and Latika Bhandari (under 53 kg) won gold medals each, Ganjot won silver in 86 kg category. Some open events are also held.

 Fencing 

Fencing started in India with foundation of Fencing Association of India in 1974. C. A. Bhavani Devi claimed a spot in the women's sabre in 2020 Olympics as one of the two highest-ranked fencers vying for qualification from Asia and Oceania in the FIE Adjusted Official Rankings and became the first Indian fencer to qualify for olympic games.

 Karate 

Karate in India is administered by the Karate India Organization. India has produced many accomplished karatekas like Aniket Gupta, Deepika Dhiman, Sunil Rathee, Supriya Jatav and Gaurva Sindhiya. The 2015 Commonwealth Karate Games were held in Delhi, India.

 Handball 

Handball is a very popular sport in India, played at the local level, but hasn't yet made an impact at the national level. India's handball team was formed & began playing on 27 April 1989, although it hasn't yet made an impact on the world stage, at the international level or the World Cup. The Handball Federation of India manages handball in India.

 Baseball and Softball 

Baseball has recently begun to show up in India. Softball is played in school and at the university level. Two Indian pitchers were selected by the "Million Dollar Arm" competition to play in the United States. A talent hunt-style competition conducted by Major League Baseball to find baseball talent in India found the teenagers Rinku Singh and Dinesh Patel, who were taken to the US and received professional coaching. These two players were selected to play for Pittsburgh Pirates minor league organisations. Rinku Singh played for the Canberra Cavalry of the Australian Baseball League for the competition's inaugural 2010–11 season.

 Rugby 

Rugby union is a minor, but fast-growing, sport in India. Some Indian sporting clubs have begun to embrace the game.

Non-Olympic sports
 Cricket 

Cricket has a long history in India, having been introduced in the country during British rule. It is the most popular spectator sport in India. India is a cricket powerhouse, having won ICC ODI World Cup twice, ICC T20 world cup once. The governing body for this sport in this nation is Board of Control for Cricket in India (BCCI). It is the richest cricket board in the world. Cricket is played on local, national, and international level, and has huge fan following from people in most parts of the nation. BCCI controls professional level, hard ball cricket But the amateur cricket do not has any governing body, which usually played with rubber ball.

India national cricket team represents India in international cricket. It is colloquially known as "Team India". It played its first Test against England at Lord's in 1932, led by C. K. Nayudu. It is one of the top teams in this sport. Indian women's national cricket team represents India in women's international cricket.

The main rival of Team India is Pakistani cricket team.

This sport generates high TV viewership during international and Indian Premier League (IPL) matches. India does not have a national game. The governing body for cricket in India, the BCCI, was formed in December 1928 and is based in Mumbai.  IPL is the richest cricket league in the world. Top players around the world annually come to India to participate in it. BCCI annually organises IPL in Summer across the country. There are many cricket broadcasting television channels in India such as Star Sports 1, Sony Ten 1, Star Sports 2 etc. and mobile, TV applications such as Disney+ Hotstar, Sony Liv, Fancode, Voot.

India will host the 2023 and 2031 ICC ODI Cricket world cups.  

India has a plethora of cricket stadiums. The nation has the biggest stadium, Narendra Modi Stadium in the world, which has 132,000 seats for viewers.

India has hosted or co-hosted many major international cricket tournaments, including the 1987 Cricket World Cup (co-hosted with Pakistan), the 1996 Cricket World Cup (co-hosted with Pakistan and Sri Lanka), the 2006 ICC Champions Trophy and the 2011 Cricket World Cup (co-hosted with Sri Lanka and Bangladesh). The India national cricket team has won major tournaments, including the 1983 Cricket World Cup in England, the 2007 ICC World Twenty20 in South Africa, the 2011 Cricket World Cup (which they won by beating Sri Lanka in the final at home), and the 2013 ICC Champions Trophy, and has shared the 2002 ICC Champions Trophy with Sri Lanka. It had also held the position of the top team in Tests.  In 2021, Team India reached to the final of the inaugural ICC World Test Championship and remained runner-up after losing against New Zealand.

India women's cricket team remained runner-up in 2005 and 2017 ICC women's cricket world cup.

The biggest domestic competitions include Ranji Trophy, Duleep Trophy, Deodhar Trophy,  Irani Trophy, Vijay Hazare Trophy and the NKP Salve Challenger Trophy. BCCI organised IPL generates atmosphere like a carnivals–fair  annually in April - May in summer season. Most of the fans prefer to witness games of the ICC tournaments, IPL. But the domestic cricket games of Ranji trophy, Vijay Hazare trophy and Duleep Trophy etc. do not get audience on TV or in stadiums.

Backyard cricket

It is a popular format of cricket played in India. In India, the game is called as Bat ball , while in England and Australia it is called as 'Backyard cricket'. Kids play it with a plastic or rubber ball. The game has a variety of rules. Due to the unavailability of large grounds, kids play it in small spaces such as the road, in backyard, in front of house. The game does not have fixed rules or a fixed number of players. The participants decide the rules before the start of the play. If there is no ball available for the game, players often play with a plastic bottle, and if they don't have a bat, then they play with a wooden stick. Some usual rules of this game in India : Batman is out if he hits a six, outside the backyard, outside the compound, on someone's roof etc. Sometimes one-bounce catch given out, if the players agree to it before initiating the game.

French cricket

It is a popular children's game in India. It is similar to cricket. In India it is called as 'Catch Catch' or 'Bat ball', while in Australia it is called as 'French cricket'. Kids often play it in the backyard, in front of a house, on the road etc. In it, the batsman holds his bat nearly horizontally, and pointing towards the bowler. As per the rules, the bowler must bowl full tosses (non-bouncing deliveries) onto the batsman's bat, with the batsman required to hit the ball in the air, and the bowler and fielders then trying to catch the ball. If the ball is caught, whoever caught it gets the chance to bat. In the game, there are no stumps, and kids play with a plastic or rubber ball. Usually there is no limit on the number of overs and the batsman can bat until he gets out.

Catch-Catch
 
Catch, Catch-Catch or playing catch, is one of the most basic children's games. It is a popular game among children in India. It is a game often played between children or between a parent and child, wherein the participants throw a ball, flying disc or similar object back and forth to each other. The game improves the hand-eye coordination of a child.

Kabaddi

Kabaddi is an indigenous sport in India. Traditionally played on rough grounds. Pro Kabaddi League is a notable league of this sport in India. It is organised annually in various spots of the nation. Star Sports, Disney+ Hotstar airs it on TV and online respectively.

India has won gold in all the Asian Games in kabaddi excepting 2018 Asian Games where they got bronze. The four forms of kabaddi recognised by the Kabaddi Federation in India are Amar, Sanjeevni, Gaminee and Punjabi rules Kabaddi. India won the Kabaddi World Championship in 2007, beating Iran 29–19.

Squash

Squash is a popular recreational sport in India, and is gaining popularity as a competitive sport. It is governed by the Squash Rackets Federation of India.

Bowls
Bowling Federation of India is the governing body of Bowling in India.

Bowling, Bowls or Lawn bowling is a new sport in India, and was not known to commoners, until Indian women's team won historic gold medal in this sport at 2022 Commonwealth Games in 'women's four' category, by the team of Nayanmoni Saikia, Lovely Choubey, Rupa Rani Tirkey and Pinki Singh. They won against South Africa. Due to it the game came into spotlight. Before this Indians also participated in this sport at 2010 Commonwealth Games. Lawn bowling was included 2007 National Games at Guwahati and first Bowling ground which is called as Green, was installed. India do not have many Green, due to player often practice on hockey grounds. The next Green was installed in Ranchi, Jharkhand for 2011 National Games of India.  Now New Delhi and Kerala also have Bowling Green, ground. In the country Jharkhand state is powerhouse in this sport, many players for India national team was selected from there. Jharkhand Bowling Association is the governing body for this sport in Jharkhand state.

 Polo 

India is considered the cradle of modern polo. Babur, the founder of the Mughal Empire in the 15th century, firmly established its popularity. The period between the decline of the Mughal dynasty and the upsurgence of the British Imperial rule, polo almost vanished from mainland India. Fortunately, the game survived in a few remote mountainous enclaves of the subcontinent, notably Gilgit, Chitral, Ladakh, and Manipur.

In India, the popularity of polo has waned and risen many times. However, it has never lost its regal status. In the last few decades, the emergence of privately owned teams has ensured a renaissance in Indian polo. Today, polo is not just restricted to the royalty and the Indian Army.

Cycle polo

The Cycle Polo Association of India was officially created in 1966 it has its office in Jaipur, Rajasthan. The first men's nationals were played in 1970 in New Delhi, with the team from Rajasthan emerging victorious. The Calcutta Cricket & Football Club hosted the first Merchant's Cup Cycle Polo tournament in 1973. Currently, the CC&FC plays host to the March Mug, the Swaroop Bhanjdeo Memorial Tournament and the CC&FC Trophy. Since 2015 onwards, CC&FC has been hosting the CC&FC All India Invitation Cycle Polo Cup which is organised jointly by the CC&FC along with the Cycle Polo Association of Bengal.

India has won 8 medals, including record 6 Gold at International Bicycle Polo Championships.

Billiards and snooker

India has been a force in world billiards competitions. Champions including Wilson Jones, Michael Ferreira, Geet Sethi and now the domination of Pankaj Advani have underlined the powerhouse status of the country. The Snooker Federation of India, the apex body, plays a proactive role in popularising the game. Many efforts have been made by the Billiards and Snooker Federation of India in the recent past to enhance the popularity of the game in the country. Several training camps for developing budding talent and providing them with regional and state sponsorship have been organised by the Billiards and Snooker Federation in various parts of the country.

 Motorsports 

Motorsport is a popular spectator sport in India, although there are relatively few competitors compared to other sports, due to the high costs of competing. Coimbatore is often referred to as the "Motor sports Capital of India" and the "Backyard of Indian Motorsports". S. Karivardhan, spearheaded motor racing, making Coimbatore the country's motor racing hub when he designed and built entry level race cars. Before Buddh International Circuit was constructed, the country's only two permanent race ways were the Kari Motor Speedway, Coimbatore and Madras Motor Racing Track, Chennai. MRF built the first Formula 3 car in 1997. MRF in collaboration with Maruti established the Formula Maruti racing, a single-seater, open-wheel class motorsport racing event for race cars made in India. MRF Challenge is a Formula 2000 open-wheel motorsport formula based series organised by Madras Motor Sports Club in association with MRF. Narain Karthikeyan and Karun Chandhok are the only drivers from to represent India in Formula 1.

On 1 February 2005, Narain Karthikeyan became India's first Formula One racing driver. In March 2007, he also became the first-ever Indian-born driver to compete in a NASCAR Series. He debuted in the NASCAR Camping World Truck Series in the Kroger 250. Force India F1 was a Formula One motor racing team. The team was formed in October 2007, when a consortium led by Indian businessmen Vijay Mallya and Michiel Mol bought the Spyker F1 team for €88 million. After competing in 29 races without a point, Force India won their first Formula One World Championship points and podium place when Giancarlo Fisichella finished second in the 2009 Belgian Grand Prix. New Delhi hosted the Indian Grand Prix from 2011 to 2013 at Buddh International Circuit in Greater Noida, 50 km from New Delhi. Karun Chandhok was the test driver for Team Lotus & Narain Karthikeyan raced for HRT during the first half of the 2011 Formula One season. Karun Chandhok participated in Friday's practice session and Karthikeyan (stepping in for Daniel Ricciardo) raced at the 2011 Indian Grand Prix; it was the first time two Indian drivers associated with the same Formula One Grand Prix directly.

Mahindra Racing is an Indian constructor competing in the Formula E Championship since the inaugural season in 2014. Alexander Sims and Alex Lynn are the team's current drivers. The team formerly competed in MotoGP, fielding a team in the junior Moto3 (125cc) category between 2011 and 2015. Mahindra later refocused on being a bike and engine supplier, ultimately pulling out of the sport in 2017.

Team MRF's Gaurav Gill the first Indian rally driver to win FIA Asia-Pacific Rally Championship in 2013.

Jehan Daruvala drives under the Indian flag in the Formula 2 Championship. He currently races for Prema Powerteam. Daruvala has three wins in the series so far.

 Powerboating 
In March 2004 Mumbai hosted the first ever F1H2O (Formula 1 Powerboat) Grand Prix of India  From 16 to 18 November 2018 Amaravati hosted the second  F1H2O World championship Grand Prix of India. The event brought wide media attention especially after one of the team took the color and the name of Andhra Pradesh Capital, making it the first Indian branded team in the history of F1H2O. Team Amaravati led by Swedish drivers Jonas Anderson and Eric Edin. During Grand Prix of France held in Evian-les-Bains Jonas Anderson took the first place and Indian flag waved on the highest step of the podium. Since then many states are considering hosting Formula One Powerboat event considering the fact that no stadium is required to be built and the event is usually free for spectators.

Boat racing 
Boat racings are popular in southern India. In Kerala many boat races are organised annually, champakulam moolam baot race, Kumarakom boat race, Payippad Jalotsavam, President's Trophy boat race, Aranmula boat race, Champions Boat League , Vallm kali, Nehru Trophy Boat Race are organised in July.

 E-sport and Gaming

Mobile gaming is very popular in India. As per analytics firm Sensor tower, by app downloads India is biggest gaming market in the world, as of March 2022, the country have 916 million installs, which is 19.2 percent of world games installed on smartphones. Fantasy gaming became a big thing, there are many fantasy gaming apps running in India. Due to rapid growth of gaming in the country, many foreign firms investing-partnering with Indian firms. PUBG was a popular game. As of 27 Aug 2022, online gaming space is worth of US$290 million. Some people play on gaming consol, person computer offline as well as online, but most of these plays on mobile phones.

Mixed Martial Arts
According to Chinese legends, it is said that an Indian monk Bodhidharma, traveled to ancient China. He created Kung-fu martial art at Shaolin Temple and created Zen brach of Buddhism. He is regarded as a great highly respected monk in China.

Fan base for Mixed Martial Arts (MMA) are growing rapidly in India. Several international promotions are trying to build a strong presence in the country, with TV viewership rising.
There are at least two organisation in India promote themselves as national Mixed Martial Arts (MMA) federation or promoter: Mixed Martial Arts Federation, India and All India Mixed Martial Arts Association.

Matrix Fight Night considered as biggest MMA promotion in India, it frequently organises live events across India. It was founded by Bollywood actor Tiger Shroff and operated by his mother Ayesha Shroff.

Bharat Khandare became the first fighter from India who signed to Ultimate Fighting Championship (UFC). UFC is the world's biggest MMA promotion. He debuted on 24 November 2017 against Song Yadong of China. UFC is a popular MMA promotion in this country. In 2023, Anshul Jubli won US fight reality show, Road to UFC and gained UFC contract. He defeated Jeka Saragih of Indonesia in the final of lightweight decision. As of 12 February 2023, Jubli is undefeated with 7 win winning streak.

Professional wrestling 

Professional wrestling is a popular sport in India. Dara Singh was a notable pro wrestler from India, who won titles internationally. In the 1950s, he won world championship against Emile Czaja, popularly known by his ring name King Kong. He also defeated world champion wrestler Lou Thesz of USA  Singh participated in almost 500 professional fights and remained undefeated in all of them, he wrestled against George Gordienko of Canada, John da Silva of New Zealand and others.  In 2018 WWE honoured Dara Singh by inducting in WWE Hall of Fame Legacy.  Tiger Joginder Singh, Arjan Singh Das was best professional wrestlers from India, who worked in promotions in Singapore, Japan, USA in the 1940s and 1950s.

Dalip Singh Rana, who is widely known by his ring name, The Great Khali was WWE World heavyweight champion in 2007. On 7 April 2021, WWE honoured The Great Khali by inducting in prestigious WWE Hall of Fame. Thus he became first professional wrestler from India who got this honour.Presently wrestlers such as Saurav Gurjar, Rinku Singh and Shanky are in WWE. After WWE, Khali moved back to India and open a pro wrestling promotion, Continental Wrestling Entertainment (CWE), by which he provide training to the budding wrestlers and organise wrestling events. WWE have been organised some live events in the India so far.https://www.abplive.com/photo-gallery/states/up-uk-up-bhadohi-rinku-singh-rajput-aka-veer-mahan-won-the-title-of-world-wrestling-entertainment-ann-2114696/amp&ved=2ahUKEwiox6qmu-76AhV3w3MBHc8eC3IQFnoECDYQAQ&usg=AOvVaw1R7xH5LyqGk99_VGrDY756

 Kickboxing 

 Kickboxing in India is promoted and governed by the Indian Association of Kickboxing Organisations which was founded by Er. S.S. Harichandan. Ratnadiptee Shimpi won a silver medal and Pankaj Mahanta, Manoj Kumar, Mohammad Amir Khan and Salam Lemba Meitei won four bronze medals in Kickboxing at the 2009 Asian Indoor Games. Indian Team under Indian Olympic Association participated in 2009 Asian Martial Arts Games where Laxmi Tyagi won a gold medal and three others bagged bronze medals.

Bodybuilding

It is practised by youngsters as recreational activity and for wellbeing. Mister India and Mister India World is country's biggest championship in this sport. India do not have a national bodybuilding federation or governing body. Indian Bodybuilding and Fitness Federation is on of a federation of this sport. 
Bollywood actors such as Tiger Shroff and Hrithik Roshan are considered as fitness icons and inspirations.

Tug of war

The origins of tug of war are uncertain, but this sport was practised in Cambodia, ancient Egypt, Greece, India and China

Archeological evidence shows that tug of war was also popular in India in the 12th century:

 Roller Sport 

'Roller sport' is popular as a recreational sport in India, especially roller skating for children, and it is gaining popularity as a competitive sport. There are clubs in cities and towns, and roller skating is taught in some schools of urban areas.

 Kurash 
Kurash Association of India overseas the sport in India. India has won two medals in the inaugural event at 2018 Asian Games.

 Sepak takraw 

Sepak takraw, though not very well known in India, was a demonstration sport at the Delhi Asian Games in 1982. The Sepaktakraw Federation of India, with its headquarters in Nagpur, Maharashtra, was founded on 10 September 1982. It is recognised by the Indian Olympic Association and Ministry of Youth Affairs and Sports since 2000. So far, the federation has conducted 14 senior, seven junior, and six sub-junior national championships in different cities, and is conducting Federation Cup Tournaments and zonal National Championships.

The game is very popular in the northeastern state of Manipur, and some of the best players came from there. In the 22nd King's Cup International Sepak Takraw Tournament held in Bangkok, the India men's team lost in the semi-finals and claimed bronze in the team event. In the doubles event, the women's team lost in the semi-finals, but earned bronze medals.

On 21 August 2018, at the 2018 Asian Games, the national men's team won a bronze after losing 2–0 to Thailand. It was Indian's first medal in Sepak takraw in Asian games.

 Wushu 

Wushu Association of India is the governing body of wushu in India. It was established in 1989. India has won 9 medals in Asian Games including one silver.

 Korfball 

Korfball, a mixed-gender ball sport, with similarities to netball and basketball, is played by over 50 countries in the world. It is not as popular in India as other sports, but is still played by a significant number of people. India came in third place twice (2002 and 2006) in the Asia-Oceania Korfball Championships.

 Floorball 

Floorball, an indoor team sport, a type of floor hockey. The Floorball Federation of India was started in 2001 and, since then, it has expanded rapidly. There have been four national floorball championships held, with Uttar Pradesh becoming the champions. Women's floorball has also expanded, and Mumbai is the first national floorball champion of India. India is a provisional member of the International Floorball Federation. India has participated in many international friendlies and steps are being taken to make India an ordinary member of floorball.

 Netball 

Netball, derived from early versions of basketball, is a popular sport in India, especially among Indian women. India's national team is ranked 25th in the world and has played only a few matches. The team has failed to qualify for any of the World Netball Championships. They played 18 matches in total. In the 2010 Commonwealth Games in Delhi, India, netball was included as a medal sport. However, the Indian team failed to win a medal.

 Throwball 

Throwball, a non-contact competitive ball sport played across a net between two teams of nine players on a rectangular court, is gaining popularity in India. Indian authorities of the game were instrumental in organising an Asian-level and, later, a world-level association for the sport. Throwball is played in gym class, colleges, and clubs throughout Asian countries such as India, Sri Lanka, Korea, Thailand, Malaysia, Japan, China, Pakistan, Nepal, Bhutan, and Bangladesh. The sport is also slowly gaining in popularity in other countries including France, Australia, Brazil, Canada, and the United Kingdom. India's junior throwball team visited Sri Lanka in 1982. Vijay Dahiya from Haryana was captain of the team. The Indian team won the test series.

 American football 
 

Introduced in 2011 by various American football figures, including Mike Ditka and Ron Jaworski, the Elite Football League of India was India's first professional American football league. Their first league play was to commence in 2012, and feature teams from eight different Indian cities.

 Lacrosse 
Lacrosse is a relatively new sport in India, introduced in 2006. The governing body for lacrosse in India is the Indian National Lacrosse Federation. It is now being played by schools in Shillong, Meghalaya, while being basically nonexistent in the rest of the country. No traces of Lacrosse in India can be found on the Internet. 

Winter sports

Winter sports are common in India in the Himalayan areas. Skiing tournaments take place every winter in Gulmarg, and Manali. Winter sports are generally more common in the northern states and territories of Jammu and Kashmir, Himachal Pradesh, Uttarakhand, Sikkim, and Arunachal Pradesh. Skiing, snow rugby, snow cycling, and snow football are some of the common winter sports played in India. Skiing is more popular, although India has taken part in luge in Winter Olympics since 1998. Shiva Keshavan is the only Indian to have won medals in international meets in winter sports (Asian Gold 2011, Asian Silver 2009, Asian Bronze 2008, Asian Silver (doubles) 2005, Asian Bronze (singles) 2005), and to have participated in four Olympic Games. He is the Asian speed record holder at 134.4 km/h, making him the fastest man in Asia on ice. Luge is practised in a big way by the mountain residents in an improvised form called "reri".

 Bandy 

India has a national bandy team. The Bandy Federation of India governs bandy in India. Its headquarters are in Mandi in Himachal Pradesh. Bandy, a team winter sport played on ice, in which skaters use sticks to direct a ball into the opposing team's goal, is generally played in northern India, where there is snow and ice. India is one of seven countries in Asia and out of a total of 28 to be a member of Federation of International Bandy. BFI planned to send a team to the 2011 Asian Winter Games in Astana-Almaty, but ultimately did not.

 Ice hockey 

Ice hockey is played in the colder parts of India, including Kashmir, Ladakh, and parts of Himachal Pradesh. Ice Hockey Association of India is national federation of this sport in India. It affiliated to International Ice Hockey Federation (IIHF), the world governing body of Ice hockey.

India men's national ice hockey team and India women's national ice hockey team represents India in international ice hockey events. The sport is not popular due to less television, media covarage, sponsorships.

Skiing
Skiing is a recreational activity that is popularly indulged in at many Himalayan Hill stations in India. Tourists enjoy skiing at places such as Manali, Jammu and Kashmir, Kasauli, Nainital, Shimla,
hung in Sikkim, Tawang in Arunachal Pradesh, Manali, Kufri, Chamba, Narkanda in Himachal Pradesh, Pahalgam and Gulmarg in Jammu and Kashmir, Mundali, Munsiari, and Auli in Uttarakhand  etc.

Adventure sports 

India is backward in adventure sports. This is due to the lack of sponsorships, encouragement from the government, training facilities, and coaching. But a significant number of people have participated in various forms of these sports.

Mountain climbing 

Mountain climbing sport has a long history in India. Many climbers from India have climbed Mount Everest. Avtar Singh Cheema was the 1st Indian mountaineer who climbed Mount Everest in 1965, and in the same year, Captain MS Kohli also climbed it. Bachendri Pal is the first Indian woman mountaineer who climbed Mount Everest, she did this feat in 1984. In 1993, Santosh Yadav became the first woman of India who climbed it twice. In 2014, Malavath Purna became the youngest Indian mountaineer who climbed Everest. Love Raj Singh Dharmshaktu has gone up on it 7 times.

India has few government institute or schools that provide training in Mountaineering : Himalayan mountaineering institute of Darjeeling, Atal Bihari Vajpayee Institute of Mountaineering and Allied Sports (ABVIMAS) Manali, both are founded by then prime minister Jawaharlal Nehru in 1954 and 1961 respectively. ABVIMAS institute also provide training in other adventure sports such as skiing, aero-sport, water sport.

Rock climbing

Rock climbing is popular among some enthusiasts of adventure sports. India has a lot of mountains; amateur and professional climbers often visit Miyar Valley of Himachal Pradesh, Shey Rock in Leh, and Sar Pass of Himachal Pradesh for rock climbing. Places such as Malshej Ghat in Maharashtra, Paithalmala in Kannur district of Kerala, Rajsangam, and Badami in Karnataka are popular rock climbing destinations. Bangalore has many climbing gyms which provide training. Ramnagara, Karnataka has a lots of rock and crags, as well as terrain features where people often do trekking and rock climbing. Spots such as Madapura Betta, Motherwall, Achalu, Senapathy, Ravugodlu, Karekallu, and Gethnaa Area crags are best for climbing. It is named after Gethnaa Government Institute for climbing.

Bouldering
Adventure sports enthusiasts do bouldering in Hampi of Karnataka. It is frequently visited by adventure seekers, because the place has infinite large boulders. It is known as a world class bouldering destination. Some bouldering spots have become well-known and frequently visited in the country. But the adventure sports do not have exposure, sponsorships, training facilities and coaching in the entire country.

Trekking
People who like outdoor activities often visit various forts of Maharashtra for trekking. Savanadurga, Karnataka is a place where Trekkers visit for Trekking

Skydiving
Sky-diving is a little new sport in India. Due to exposure of online media and television, this sport became well known in past some decades. India have some private institutes or Sky diving operators across the nation, who provides services to enthusiasts who want to do skydiving. In Maharashtra adventure seekers do skydiving at Aamby valley, Tourist can experience this sport throughout year here. It is the best place for Tandem jump or Tandem skydiving. This skydiving place is present 3 hr away from Mumbai. Similarly skydiving companies or spots are present Hyderabad in Telangana, skydiving companies organise the driving camps regularly. In Tamil Nadu's Pondicherry skydiving operators offers static as well as Tandem jump. Other skydiving spots include Mysore, Bir Billing of Himachal Pradesh. The later is the hotspot for adventure enthusiasts in this nation.

Bungee Jumping
Bungee jumping is a popular adventure sport and recreational activity in some tourist places of India. The facilities for bungee jumping are present at Mohan Chatti village near Rishikesh, with its height being 83 m. In Maharashtra, tourists enjoy it in Kunegaon at Lonavala, with its height being 45 metres,  and at Ozon Adventures in Benglore, Karnataka, with its height being 40 meters and being unique because it does not have a fixed platform for jumping like the above places have; the participants jump from the top of a crane. Jagdalpur of Chhattisgarh has a 30-meters tall bungee jump. In New Delhi people try it at Wanderlust.

Giant Swing
It is a recreational activity which tourists enjoy in Rishikesh of North India. In Giant Swing, participants can experience a bungee jumping-like experience after a fall, with the harness swinging the participants like a pendulum.

Zip lining
It is a popular recreational activity in India at the tourist places, where it is available. Spots such as Mehrangarh fort, Rajasthan. and Devgad in Sindhudurg district of Maharashtra have zip-lining facilities.

River Rafting
Water sports gained tremendous popularity in India in the last few decades. Indians participate in river rafting in many places across the nation. Rishikesh is considered as biggest hub of River rafting in India. Another notable place where people indulge in this sport are Kullu-Manali, where rafting begins from Pirdi and passes through points such as Bajaura, Bhuntar and Mohal. On Indus river in Leh Ladakh, on Yamuna river in Uttarakhand state, on the rapid streams of Tons river and Teesta River in Sikkim, on one of the biggest river Brahmputra in Sikkim. Lohit River, Kameng River in Arunachal Pradesh, Barapole in Karnataka here upper river consists of 4, 3 grades streams, Kundalika River in Maharashtra.

 Gambling, poker, fantasy sports and betting 

Gambling is illegal in most of the states except Goa, Mizoram, Sikkim, Nagaland states and Daman, where land based gambling and casinos are legal under the Public Gambling Act, 1976 of Indian Penal Code. Gambling is illegal in Maharashtra state, under the Bombay Prevention of Gambling Act 1887, but it is still widely played underground in various spots of Maharashtra state. Although there are laws against gambling in most of the states, gamblers still find a way to gamble throughout India. The asses play the Seven Eight, Rummy, Teen patti, Seven on Seven, Blackjack, Bluff, Bridge, Mendikot, and Three to Five variants of Poker. These games are widely considered to be gambling. India has a plethora of online Fantasy gaming apps which the masses spend money to play. In these fantasy games, players make teams using mobile phones. Often questions are raised that these fantasy online games are gambling, but these apps advertise themselves as being legal and not forms of gambling, but rather games of skills. Some states have banned these apps. Betting is illegal in India, but the nation doesn't have a proper law against online gambling. Many gambling platforms and mobile apps advertise themselves during the IPL, international, and domestic cricket matches on television through surrogate advertisements in India, Some of these apps are 1xBet, Fairplay, PariMatch, Betway and Wolf 777, with most of these websites and apps operating from outside of India. Betting on horse racing is legal, while matka gambling is ill-legal in this nation.

Lottery gambling is legal and allowed to be played in 13 states while the rest of the states have banned it, but lottery selling and buying happens in every state. Even in the states where it is banned, they do not have stringent laws and police do not enforce the existing laws. In some states such as Mizoram, Kerala, Nagaland and Sikkim, it is legal and hugely popular. 13 states that allows lotteries are: Kerala, Goa, Maharashtra, Madhya Pradesh, Punjab, West Bengal, Assam, Arunachal Pradesh, Meghalaya, Manipur, Sikkim, Nagaland and Mizoram. It was very popular in the states of Tamil Nadu and Karnataka, but now it is totally banned. In the states where it is banned, the ban is not effective and lotteries are conducted actively through apps and online websites.

 Poker – Bridge game 

Pranab Bradhan and Shibhnath Sarkar have won gold medals at the 2018 Asian Games in bridge game at Jakarta. Indians also won two bronze medals in the event. This was the first time the game was played in such a major international event. The Bridge Federation of India (BFI) is the governing body for bridge game in India. BFI nominated Bradhan and Sarkar's names for the Arjuna Award in 2020.

Traditional games 

Yoga
It was part of the National games of 2022.

Indian martial arts

India has many traditional regional forms of martial arts such as lathi khela, sqay, kalari, kushti, thang-ta, silambam and Kalaripayattu.

Board games

Board Games such as Carrom, Ludo, Snakes and ladders and Tick-Tack-Toe are widely played as pass time, mostly by kids. These games also played online on mobiles.

Kho-kho

Kho kho is a tag sport played by teams of twelve players who try to avoid being touched by members of the opposing team, only nine players of the team enter the field. It is one of the two most popular traditional tag games played in schools, the other being kabbadi. Kho Kho Federation of India overseas the sports in the country. In 2022, the first season of Ultimate Kho Kho, a domestic franchise Kho-kho competition, took place in India.

Lagori
Lagori is played by children of all ages throughout India. In this there are usually 12 players, 6 in each time. A ball and 9 flat rocks are need to play this game. The rocks are piled in the center on top of each other from the largest to the smallest flat rock. Then both the teams alternatively hit that pile by a ball. The team which hits the pile first and manages topple the pile of rocks gets the chance to hold the ball and hit the player of opposite team with that ball. The task of the opposite team is to re-arrange the pile of rock without getting hit by the ball. Whichever players get hit by the ball is out and the task is taken further by remaining player of his team. If the team with the ball succeeds to out all the players before they could re-arrange the pile they win. If the team manages to re-arrange the pile then the team with the ball loses.

Kancha
Kancha is played by using marbles. Marbles are glass balls which are very popular among children. It is popular in small Indian cities and villages, among small children only as a gully sport. The participant has to hit the marble kept in a circle. If he hits the target properly, he wins. The winner gets the kancha of the other participant boys.

Gilli-danda

Gilli-danda, Karra billa or Viti Dandu in Marathi is a game played by using one small stick (gilli) and a large stick (danda) like cricket, with the ball replaced by gilli. It is still played in villages of Andhra Pradesh, Karnataka, Tamil Nadu, Rajasthan, Uttar Pradesh, Madhya Pradesh, Bihar, Punjab, Maharashtra and Gujarat in India only as a recreational game among boys.

Kite-flying
Kite-flying is pursued by many people in India, in cities as well as villages. The festival of Makar Sankranti features kite-flying competitions. It is festival which is a passion among Indians.

Pola race 

Pola race is traditional bull race organised in rural areas of Maharashtra state. People in villages organise it annually on the day of Pola festival. Usually owners of the Bulls run along with them in predefined distance of 100–150 metres approximately. In August 2017 and again on 6 September 2021, Government of Maharashtra banned it.

Bullock cart race 

It is a rural traditional race, villagers in Maharashtra organise Bullock cart race. In 2017 Bombay High Court passed an interim order to restraining Maharashtra government to give permission to this race in anywhere in Maharashtra. This type of bullock carts races are also organised in Karnataka and Tamil Nadu state. People for the Ethical Treatment of Animals (PETA) and other activists field petitions opposing these races.

 Buffalo fights 

Buffalo fights are organised in some areas of this nation on rural festivals annually. In Assam state, it organised on Magh Bihu or Bhogali Bihu. Many people think these fights are cruelty to animals, animal suffer, die and fatally injured during them. Some field petitions against them in court. In 2014, Supreme court of India banned any kind of animal fights or races instructed Animal Welfare Board of India (AWBI) and state government to stop inflicting pain  and suffering on animals. But still the fights are ill-legally organised in India. In Shahapur and Bhopal of Madhya Pradesh buffalo fights are organised annually. “It is sad that these animals are made to suffer in the name of entertainment",
as per PETA India campaign coordinator, Sachin Bangera. In these illegal fight many buffalo bulls dies. Buffalo fights are also organised in village of Purulia district, West Bengal, Padarahi and Rampur villages of Muzaffarpur district, Bihar.

Jallikattu 

Jallikattu is a popular bull-taming sport practiced particularly during Pongal festival. Jallikattu was a popular sport since the Tamil classical period. It is a controversial sport and is deemed as cruel by many Animal rights national as well as international activists and organisations.

Kambala Kambala race is a traditional race sport of coastal area of Karnataka state in South India. It is an animal-man race in which man run with his two buffalos in mud, 132m or 143m long distance. Kambala, which roughly translates to "paddy-growing mud field" in the that area local Tulu language. It is a controversial race and has been criticised by international animal rights organisations.

Rekla race 

Rekla race is a type of bullock cart race. In May 2014, the Supreme Court of India banned it citing animal welfare issues.

Water fight 

Children play this game annually during Rang Panchami festival in Maharashtra. Many participants play Water fights using water gun amid Rangpanchami annual Hindu festival. The game is played mostly by Kids, yong boys-girls and children. In it they color each other with different kind of colors, spray water, water colour by Water gun. During the festival kids play with each other and try to wet, in a playful manner. Youngsters try to colour each other during this festival.

Other Traditional and Kids' games
Uriyadi involves smashing a small earthen pot with a long stick, usually with a cloth wrapped around the eyes to prevent the participants from seeing the pot. Seasonal sports such as Dahi Handi also have a following.

Other regional sports include Ilavatta kal where huge spherical rocks are lifted, and Nondi, which is a hopscotch game played by folding one leg and hopping squares. Other regional games such as atya patya, hide-and-seek, Top, Lagori, Sack race, Blindfold-game, Nimbu Chamcha, Chase, langdi, surr, gatka, mallakhamb, chor police and Dhaba Kuti have dedicated followers, with kids playing most of these games. Indoor games include Pallanguzhi involving beads, Bambaram involving the spinning of a top, Dhayakattai which is a modified dice game, Aadu puli attam, Nungu vandi and Seechangal.

Other games

Other sports and games including Air sports, Water sports, Triathlon, Pentathlon, Arm Wrestling, Bowling, Ball Hockey, Soft tennis, Australian rules football, Darts, Frisbee, Fistball and Tennikoit have dedicated followers and their own national sports federations.

India has achieved success in some of these games. They have won a silver medal at 2019 Ball Hockey World Championship. They have won five medals, including two gold at Commonwealth Tenpin Bowling Championships. They have won two medals at Asia-Pacific Fistball Championships.

National teams

Sports tournaments in India 

Multi sports events

Major sporting competitions

Defunct competitions

Sports broadcasters in India

Major sports television networks include Star Sports, Sony Sports, Sports18, Eurosport India, 1Sports, DD Sports. Historically, Doordarshan was the only broadcaster of multinational sports events and cricket in the country. In 1992, the government began giving licences for private television channels to be started. Star Sports is the first 24 hours sports channel in the country, with many foreign and Indian organisations starting dedicated sports channels later on. In recent years after 3G and 4G networks launched and became widespread in India, OTT (online streaming) apps became a big thing and the OTT market became very competitive. Indian sports broadcasters spend more on cricket then other sports. According to GroupM ESP's Sporting Nation report, in 2021, 444 endorsement deals happened, with 318 of them being signed by cricketers. In 2020, Indian sports industry spent 9,500 crore rupees, which it superseded in 2021 by a growth of 62%. Various companies spend a huge amount of money on advertising by signing various sports players for themselves such as Neeraj Chopra, PV Sindhu, Rohit Sharma and Virat Kohli etc.List of major sports channels in India:List of other OTT platforms broadcasting sports in India: Former channels 
 ESPN
 Star Cricket
 Zee Sports 
 Ten Golf 
 Neo Sports
 Neo Prime
 Star ESPN
 Sony ESPN
 Sony Ten Golf HD

 Sports awards 

 Major Dhyan Chand Khel Ratna — This is India's highest award for achievement in sports. It recognises "the spectacular and most outstanding performance in the field of sports by a sportsperson". As of 2018, the award comprises a medallion, a certificate, and a cash prize of ₹7.5 lakh (US$11,000).
 Dhyan Chand Award — lifetime achievement award in sport
 National Sports Awards — for excellence in sport 
 Dronacharya Award — It is awarded for excellence in coaching. It honours coaches "who have done outstanding and meritorious work on a consistent basis", and is meant to motivate them towards "raising the standard of sportspersons". As of 2017, the award comprises a bronze statuette of Dronacharya, a certificate, ceremonial dress, and a cash prize of ₹5 lakh (US$7,200).
 Arjuna Award —  For excellence in sport at world stage. It includes rupees 500,000 and broze statue of Arjun. This award was founded in 1961. 
 Tenzing Norgay National Adventure Award —  This award is granted to the sportsperson, who did outstanding feat in the field of adventure sport. It is presented by president of India. This award is named after Indian mountaineer Tenzing Norgay, who was second ever person who climbed Mount Everest.
 BCCI Awards — It is a cricket award, in which Board of Control for Cricket in India handover awards in different categories to the cricket players.
 AIFF Awards — It is an award for football players, in which All India Football Federation handover awards in different categories to the football players.

Sports education 

 Sports degree  
In India, the schools and colleges normally have a sports teacher who manages, trains and coaches students in various sports for inter-school tournaments. To become a sport teacher in a school one needs to have a sports diploma or degree, such as a Bachelor of Physical Education (also known by the abbreviation, B.PEd).Sports universities and colleges'''

Names of India's some prominent sports colleges and universities are given below :

 YMCA College of Physical Education, Chennai

It is the first physical education college not only in India but also in Asia. It was established in 1920 by an American sports coach, physical education instructor, Harry Crowe Buck in Madras (now Chennai). He has been called as The father of physical education in India. The college offers undergraduates, postgraduates, diploma and other certificate courses in Physical education and sports sciences. Bachelor Of Mobility Science (B.M.S) programme is recognized by Rehabilitation Council of India (RCI).

 Guru Gobind Singh Sports College, Lucknow
 
It is a residential sports college, and is often deemed one of the best in the country. Located in Guramba, Lucknow, Uttar Pradesh, this college trains its students in football, hockey, athletics, badminton, swimming, and kabaddi. Cricketers Suresh Raina and R P Singh, hockey player Jagbir Singh, and runner Indrajeet Patel are some of the famous alumni of this college.

 Netaji Subhas National Institute of Sports, Patiala

Commonly known as National Institute of Sports (NIS), this is the academic wing of Sports Authority of India (SAI) and Asia's largest sports institute. Located in Patiala, this government college is affiliated to Punjabi University and Baba Farid University of Health Sciences. Housed in Old Motion Bagh Palace, this institute spreads over 286 acres and offers facilities for many sports including wrestling, judo, golf, archery, wushu and football.

 Lakshmibai National College of Physical Education, Trivandrum

The college is associated with SAI and is located in Karivattom in the district of Trivandrum, Kerala. This college was established under the Department of Youth Affairs and Sports under the Government of India. Facilities for physical education, sports, and teacher-training are offered in the college.

 Indira Gandhi Institute of Physical Education and Sports Sciences, New Delhi 

Located in Vikaspuri, New Delhi, this institute is under the University of Delhi and offers all categories of teacher training courses in physical education.

 Bombay Physical Culture Association College of Physical Education (BPCACPE)

The college, located in Wadala, Mumbai, was started in the year 1978 with a mission to create qualified teachers in physical education.

 Lakshmibai National Institute of Physical Education (LNIPE)

The institute is situated in Gwalior, Madhya Pradesh. It was founded by the Indian government's sponsorship. It is a deemed university established to promote Sport education.

The college was established in memory of Indian freedom fighter, the Queen Lakshami Bai.

 Tamil Nadu Physical Education and Sports University

The first university established exclusively for physical education in the country, it is located in Chennai, Tamil Nadu and is under the chancellery of the governor of the state.

 Amity School of Physical Education and Sports Sciences, Noida

Affiliated to the Amity University, this college offers courses for teacher trainees in physical education.

 Chandrasekhar Agashe College of Physical Education, Pune

The college, affiliated to the Savithribai Phule Pune University, provides teacher training in physical education. The students are chosen through an entrance test which involves a written test, fitness tests and an interview.

 College of Physical Education, Pune

A unit of the Bharathi Vidyapeeth Deemed University, this college offers a bachelor's degree in teacher training. It is a self-financing institution which has been accredited by NAAC – grade A. 

 D.Y. Patil sports academy, Navi Mumbai 

It is situated in Nerul area of Navi Mumbai in Maharashtra state. It is a private academy, it have an international standards cricket stadium that is DY Patil stadium.

Sports equipment industry 

The nation has a lot of firms that manufacture sport equipment. Some notable Indian brands are Sanspareils Greenlands (SG), BDM and TYKA. According to a report, sports equipment businesses of India were worth of US$20 bn in 2020. It is estimated that in 2027, the industry will be worth US$100 bn. Jalandhar is a sport goods hub, and as per ThePrint, it is worth US$241,569,000. Meerut is another sports good industry hub in India, which exports sports goods around the world.

The leading sports equipment manufacturing brands in India are Nivia, Cosco, Provogue (manufactures sportswears and apparels), Seven (footwears, casuals and sportswears), SIX5SIX (sportswears, equipment), SS.

Nivia is the official ball partner of ISL and the Basketball Federation of India.

 In popular culture 
Sport are depicted in various movies, documentaries and in literature in India. Some prominents are given below -

 Movies - About Running : Budhia Singh – Born to Run (2016), Rashmi Rocket (2021), About cricket : Shabaash Mithu (2022), Jersey (2019), M.S. Dhoni: The Untold Story (2016), About MMA : Brothers (2015), Liger (2022), About mountaineering : Poorna: Courage Has No Limit (2017), About Rugby : Sye (2004), About football : Dhan Dhana Dhan... Goal (2007), About Badminton : Saina (2021), About boxing : Mary Kom (2014).
 Documentaries - About cricket : Roar of the Lion (2019), Inside story : a season with Rajasthan Royals, Sachin: A Billion Dreams (2017), Netflix's Caught out (2023); About Tennis : Break Point (2021). 
 Books - About cricket Playing It My Way, autobiography of Sachin Tendulkar written by Tendulkar and Ghostwriter Boria Majumdar. About football Box to Box: 75 years of the Indian football team authored by sports journalist Jaydeep Basu. 
 Television serials - Cricket : Jersey No. 10''.

See also  

 India at the Olympics
 India at the Asian Games 
 India at the South Asian Games
 India at the Commonwealth Games
 India at the Lusophony Games
 India at the Military World Games 
 Indian Olympic Association
 India at the Paralympics
 India at the Asian Para Games
 Paralympic Committee of India
 India at the Deaflympics
 India at the Special Olympics
 Special Olympics Bharat
 India at the Universiade
 India at the Gymnasiade
 National Games of India
 Khelo India Youth Games
 Khelo India University Games
 Khelo India Winter Games
 Sports Authority of India (SAI)
 List of sports events in India

Footnotes

References